Lobelia anceps, commonly known as trailing lobelia, is a small herbaceous, flowering plant in the family Campanulaceae. It has dark blue or purple flowers and grows in New South Wales and Queensland.

Description
The two upper petals curve inward and are covered with soft, thin hairs.

Taxonomy and naming
Lobelia andrewsii was first formally described in 2001 by Thomas G. Lammers and the description was published in Novon. The specific epithet (andrewsii) honours Henry Cranke Andrews.

Distribution and habitat
Trailing lobelia grows in open forest and mostly on sandy soils north of the Royal National Park, inland to Howell and west of Tenterfield.

References

andrewsii
Plants described in 2001
Flora of Queensland
Flora of New South Wales